Catalyst Story Institute & Content Festival, formerly the ITVFest (The Independent Television Festival), is an arts organization and an annual festival gathering of fans, artists and executives from around the world to celebrate outstanding independent narrative production. 

The festival gives independent television and narrative artists the opportunity to share their work with television professionals and a larger community of independent TV producers. 

Catalyst Story Institute & Content Festival is the only independent television festival in the United States. ITVFest is the first festival dedicated to independently produced pilots and webseries, with an emphasis on new media. 

Festival support has come from companies and media outlets including Sony, The TV Academy (the Emmys), Fox TV Studios, RDF, Comedy Central, SyFy, FX (TV channel), GSN, HBO, Current TV, The Hollywood Reporter, Tubefilter, Stickam, B-Side and Comcast.

History
Catalyst Story Institute & Content Festival was founded as The Independent Television Festival in 2006 by producer AJ Tesler, and was originally held in Los Angeles, California.

In 2013, Philip Gilpin, Jr. took over as the festival's Executive Director. ITVFest moved from Los Angeles to Vermont to find a rural setting where industry leaders and creators could escape the big city to build relationships with the goal of creating an industry pipeline for independent television creators to have direct access to industry decision makers. In 2015, on attending ITVFest IndieWire called independent television is "a real, new part of the industry that deserves attention."

In 2017, ITVFest partnered with HBO in a deal that awarded festival winners meetings with top executives. Bob Bakish, CEO of Viacom, keynoted at ITVFest 2017. In 2018, Adaptive Studios bought the rights to Astral, a television drama set to include actors Ben Affleck and Matt Damon, from a creator met at ITV Festival. Powderkeg's Laura Fischer and Gary Dourdan were among the judges at ITVFest in 2018. After ITVFest 2018, Vermont officials dropped their support for television and film in the state.

In 2019, ITVFest moved to Duluth, Minnesota, attracting thousands of attendees. 
Also in 2019, ITVFest contracted a multiyear sponsorship with Abrams Artists Agency, marking the first direct connection between a TV festival and an agency, while simultaneously rebranding to Catalyst Story Investitute & Content Festival.

Previous winners
2019 winners
 Best Breakout Creators - Sam and Colby 
 Best Breakout Series - "Challenge Accepted"
 Best Script Pitch - "Georgi & the Bot" 
 Best Documentary - "Beneath the Ink"  
 Best Reality Series - "Run" 
 Best Animation - "Starship Goldfish" 
 Best Short Film - "Lose It" 
 Best Short Comedy Series - "Doxxed" 
 Best Short Drama Series - "Dad Man Walking" 
 Best Comedy Series - "This Isn't Me" 
 Best Drama Series - "Home Turf" 
 Best Comedy Script - Wendy Braff, "Mr. Trivia" 
 Best Drama Script - Justin Moran, "Rust"
 Best Cinematography -  Ryan Z. Emanuel, "Chosen" 
 Best Writing - Brandon Garegnani, "Scribbles" 
 Best Directing -  Mara Joly, "Home Turf" 
 Best Editing - Oliver Parker, "The System" 
 Best Comedy Actor - Ben Kawaller, "This Isn't Me" 
 Best Comedy Actress - Ani Tatintsyan, "Pre-Mortem"
 Best Drama Actor - Akintola Jiboyewa, "The System" 
 Best Drama Actress - Alison Jaye, "Chosen" 
 Best of Festival - "Work/Friends"

2019 Documentary Official Selection
 Beneath the Ink
 Caminantes (Walkers)
 Jeffrey T. Larson
 Magnolia's Hope
 Outsourced: The New Wisconsin Idea

2018 winners
 Best Podcast - Yarn Story Podcast
 Best Drama Script - Near Death, Owen Hornstein III, Andrew Bryan, And James Roe
 Best Comedy Script - Not Liz, Liz Murpy
 Best Documentary - Jacks & Jills
 Best Short Film - Monday
 Best Cinematography - Adrian Correia, Avenues
 Best Reality - Charlie Bee Company
 Best Writing - Stephen Ohl, White River Tales
 Best Editing - Darian Dauchan, The New Adventures of Brobot Johnson
 Best Drama Actor - Kolman Domingo, Nothingham
 Best Drama Actress - Vongai Shava, Patiri in the Promise Land
 Best Comedy Actor - Tomy Kang, Taking a Hit
 Best Comedy Actress - Caroline Parsons, The Russian Cousin
 Best Directing - Yair Valer, Wild Weeds
 Web Short Comedy Series - Susaneland
 Best Short Drama Series - Revenge Tour
 Best Drama Series - Currency
 Best Comedy Series - Filth City
 Best of ITVFest  - 88
2016 winners
 Best TV Short Drama - People Like Us

2015 winners
 Best Visual Effects - Border Queen
 Best Reality - Kickin' it Caucasian
 Best Short Film - February
 Best Writing - The Wake
 Best Cinematography - Zero Point
 Best Acting Ensemble - Fu@K I Love U
 Best Actor - Darrell Lake, The Incredible Life of Darrell
 Best Actress - Alex Trow, Cooking for One
 Best Director - Kerry Valderrama, Sanitarium
 Best Documentary - Port of Indecision
 Web Web Series Comedy - The KATEering SHow
 Best Web Series Drama - Farr
 Best TV Drama - Trouble
 Best TV Comedy - Life Sucks
 Best of ITVFest  - The Wake

2013 winners
 Best in Show - Old Souls
 Best Acting - Mythos
 Best Comedy - Preggers
 Best Drama - Event Zero
 Best Documentary - Comrade Sunshine

2012 winners
 Best Writer - Underwater, Nathan Marshall & Michael Traynor
 Best Actress in a Drama - Underwater, Rachel Nichols

2010 winners
 "Innovator" Award - Illeana Douglas
 Best Overall Web - Octane Pistols of Fury, Chris Prine, Greg Stees
 Best Overall TV - Going to Pot, Leo Simone, Scott Perlman, Jamie Kennedy
 Best Documentary - Going to Pot, Leo Simone, Scott Perlman, Jamie Kennedy
 Best Animated Pilot- Time Traveling Finger, Stephen Leonard
 Best Drama - the_source, Marc D’Agostino
 Best Comedy- Octane Pistols of Fury, Chris Prine, Greg Stees
 Mobifest Winner - Phobias, Kasi Brown and Brandon Walter
 Best Actor - La Manzana, Paula Roman
 Best Director - 15 Minutes, Bobby Salomon
 Best Writer - Odd Jobs, Jeremy Redleaf
 Best Cinematographer - Goodsam & Max, Gil Nievo

2009 winners
 "I Am Independent" Award - Kevin Pollak
 Best Overall Web - OzGirl, Nicholas Carlton, Sophie Tilson
 Best Overall TV - Dog, Barry Gribble
 Best Documentary - Pushing The Limits, Javier Bermudez
 Best Animated Pilot- Wentworth & Buxbury, Lucas Crandles, Timothy Nash and Hayden Grubb
 Best Drama - Urban Wolf, Napoleon Premiere, Laurent Touil-Tartour
 Best Comedy- MERRIme.com, Kaily Smith
 Mobifest Winner - Chelsey & Kelsey, Claire Coffee, Ellie Knaus, Marie-Amelie Rechberg
 Best Actor - OzGirl, Shanrah Wakefield, Sophie Tilson
 Best Director - Dark Room Theater, Benjamin Pollack
 Best Writer - Imaginary Bitches, Andrew Miller
 Best Cinematographer - Goodsam & Max, Gil Nievo

2008 winners
 Best Dramatic Program - Turnover, Michael Blieden
 Best Comedic Program - Small Bits of Happiness, Blake Barrie and Thiago Gadelha
 Best Documentary Program - Wal-Mart Nation - Andrew Munger
 Best Alternative Program - Welcome to Plainville - Jason Frederick, Anne Gregory, Kevin McShane, Opus Moreschi, Charlotte Newhouse
 Best Webseries - Violent Jake, Samuel Smith, Clint Gossett and Tansy Brook
 Audience Award - Small Town News - Sarah Babineau
 Best Director - Turnover, Michael Blieden
 Best Writer - Hit Factor, James Cromwell, Saba Homayoon, Neil Hopkins, Jamie Rosenblatt, Kerry Sullivan
 Best Ensemble Acting - Hit Factor, James Cromwell, Saba Homayoon, Neil Hopkins, Jamie Rosenblatt, Kerry Sullivan

2007 Winners
 Best Dramatic Program - The Collectors, Steve Alper
 Best Comedic Program - Partners - Seth Menachem, Avi Rothman
 Best Documentary Program - Gusto - Mike Maniglia, Subterra Films
 Best Alternative Program - King Kaiser - Steven Burrows, The Burrows of Hollywood
 Best Webseries - Trekant, Diaperdog Productions
 Audience Award - King Kaiser - Steven Burrows, The Burrows of Hollywood
 Webseries Audience Award - Flipper Nation, Space Shank Media
 Vuze Second Chance Competition - Adam Ray TV, Adam Ray
 Best Director - Mr. Jackson's Neighborhood, Nathan Marshall
 Best Writer - Deal With It, Steven Muterspaugh, Michael Kary, Jamey Hood and Karin Kary
 Best Ensemble Acting - Grounds Zero, Alan Keller

2006 Winners
 Best Dramatic Program - "FBI Guys" - Paul Darrigo, 2 Wolves Production
 Best Comedic Program - "As Seen on TV" - Ryan Sage
 Best Variety Program - "Loading Zone" - Nick Barnes, Frog Island Films
 Best Reality Program - "Meet Tom Kramer" - Rachael Pihlaja
 Audience Award - "This is My Friend" - Jeremy Konner, Morning Knight Films
 Best Director - "The Perverts" - John Gegenhuber, The Perverts Pictures
 Best Writer - "As Seen on TV" - Ryan Sage
 Best Ensemble Acting - "Van Stone: Tour of Duty" - Tim Bennett, Dakota

See also

 List of television festivals

References

External links
 Official Website
 Twitter
 YouTube

Festivals in Los Angeles
Television festivals
New media
Multigenre conventions
Festivals in Minnesota
Arts festivals in California